The 1974 Harvard Crimson football team was an American football team that represented Harvard University during the 1974 NCAA Division I football season. Harvard was co-champion of the Ivy League.

In their fourth year under head coach Joe Restic, the Crimson compiled a 7–2 record and outscored opponents 236 to 129. Brian P. Hehir was the team captain.

Harvard's 6–1  conference record tied for best in the Ivy League standings. The Crimson outscored Ivy opponents 191 to 91. Harvard shared the league title with Yale, despite beating the Bulldogs in the final game of the season.

Harvard played its home games at Harvard Stadium in the Allston neighborhood of Boston, Massachusetts.

Schedule

References

Harvard
Harvard Crimson football seasons
Ivy League football champion seasons
Harvard Crimson football
Harvard Crimson football